Mandarin or The Mandarin may refer to:

Language
 Mandarin Chinese, branch of Chinese originally spoken in northern parts of the country
 Standard Chinese or Modern Standard Mandarin, the official language of China
 Taiwanese Mandarin, Standard Chinese as spoken in Taiwan
 Mandarin (late imperial lingua franca), the spoken standard of the Ming and Qing dynasties of China

Biological species
 Mandarin orange (Citrus reticulata), a sweet, orange-like citrus fruit
 Mandarin duck (Aix galericulata), a perching duck species found in East Asia
 Mandarin dogfish, two species of small shark in the genus Cirrhigaleus off East Asian coast
 Mandarinfish (disambiguation), various fishes
 Mandarin vole (Lasiopodomys mandarinus), a species of vole found in China and the Korean Peninsula
 Spotted mandarin (disambiguation), various species

Arts, entertainment, and media
 The Miraculous Mandarin, a one-act pantomime ballet composed by Béla Bartók
 Mandarin (character), a supervillain in the Marvel Comics universe
 Mandarin (SRMTHFG), a character in the animated TV series Super Robot Monkey Team Hyperforce Go!
 The Mandarin (website), an Australian online magazine
 MTV Mandarin, a 24-hour music channel owned by MTV Networks Asia Pacific

Novels
 The Mandarin (novel), an 1880 novel by the Portuguese writer José Maria de Eça de Queirós
 The Mandarins, 1954 novel by Simone de Beauvoir
 Mandarin (Elegant novel), a 1983 novel by Robert Elegant
 Mandarin (Havan novel), a 2008 novel by John Havan

Clothing
 Mandarin gown or cheongsam, a Chinese style of dress
 Mandarin collar, a short shirt or jacket collar that is not folded from Qing era China
 Mandarin square, a badge worn by officials in Imperial China

Companies
 Mandarin Airlines, a subsidiary of China Airlines
 The Mandarin, former name of Mandarin Oriental, Hong Kong, a Hong Kong hotel
 Mandarin Films, a film production company of Hong Kong
 Mandarin Publishing, a publishing unit of Random House
 Mandarin Restaurant, an all-you-can-eat Chinese-Canadian buffet chain in Ontario, Canada
 Mandarin Software, a British software developer / publisher

Other uses
 Mandarin (bureaucrat), a bureaucrat of Imperial China (the original meaning of the word)
 by extension, any senior government bureaucrat
 Mandarin cuisine, another name for Beijing cuisine
 Mandarin (Jacksonville), a 19th-century community, since absorbed into the city limits of Jacksonville, United States
 Mandarin High School, a high school in the southern part of Jacksonville, Florida, United States
 Mandarins Drum and Bugle Corps, a drum and bugle corps from Sacramento, California, United States
 Mandarin porcelain, a wide range of porcelain that was made and decorated in China exclusively for export to Europe and later to North America
 Mandarin paradox, an ethical parable

See also
 Mandarina, a genus of land snail
 Korean mandarin (disambiguation)
 Mandrin (disambiguation)